Lipovicë or Lipovica is a village in Lipjan municipality. It is next to the Blinaja Park where people go hunting in  Kosovo.

Annotations

References 

Villages in Lipljan